Joe Ma may refer to:

 Joe Ma (actor) (born 1968), Hong Kong actor and former policeman
 Joe Ma (filmmaker) (born 1964), Hong Kong film director, scriptwriter and producer

See also
Joseph Ma (disambiguation)